Nelson Daniel Gutiérrez Luongo (born 13 April 1962) is a Uruguayan former footballer who played as a defender. He obtained a total number of 57 international caps for the Uruguay national football team, and was a member of the team that competed at the 1986 and 1990 FIFA World Cups.

Biography

Gutiérrez started his playing career in 1980 with Peñarol. He was part of the squad that won the league championships in 1981 and 1982.

1982 also saw Peñarol win the Copa Libertadores and the Copa Intercontinental against Aston Villa F.C. of England.

In 1985 Gutiérrez joined Atlético Nacional of Colombia, but he didn't settle and soon joined River Plate of Argentina.

Gutiérrez helped River to win the Argentine Primera in 1985–86 and was part of the squad that won the club's first Copa Libertadores title in 1986. They also won the Copa Intercontinental and the Copa Interamericana during his time with the club.

In the late 1980s he moved to Italy where he played for Lazio and then Hellas Verona. Between 1991 and 1993 he played in Spain for Logroñés before returning to Uruguay.

Gutiérrez returned to Peñarol in 1993 and helped the club to win the Uruguayan championship in 1993, 1994, 1995 and 1996. He finished his playing career with Defensor Sporting Club in 1997.

Honours

Peñarol

Uruguayan First Division (6): 1981, 1982, 1993, 1994, 1995, 1996
Copa Libertadores (1): 1982
Intercontinental Cup (1): 1982

River Plate

Argentine First Division (1): 1985-86
Copa Libertadores (1): 1986
Intercontinental Cup (1): 1986
Copa Interamericana (1): 1986

Uruguay
''' Copa America:1983,1987,runner-up 1989

References
  Profile

External links

Profile at Lega Calcio

1962 births
Living people
Uruguayan footballers
Uruguayan people of Italian descent
Association football defenders
Footballers from Montevideo
Uruguay international footballers
1986 FIFA World Cup players
1990 FIFA World Cup players
1983 Copa América players
1987 Copa América players
1989 Copa América players
Peñarol players
Atlético Nacional footballers
Club Atlético River Plate footballers
Uruguayan Primera División players
La Liga players
Serie A players
Serie B players
Argentine Primera División players
 Copa Libertadores-winning players
Uruguayan expatriate footballers
Expatriate footballers in Italy
Expatriate footballers in Spain
Expatriate footballers in Argentina
S.S. Lazio players
Hellas Verona F.C. players
CD Logroñés footballers
Defensor Sporting players
Copa América-winning players